Madrasa Al Habibia Al Sughra is one of the madrasahs of the medina of Tunis. It was built in 1927 by Muhammad VI al-Habib, from whom its name is derived. This madrasa is one of the newest schools of the medina of Tunis.

In addition to its educational role, the madrasa accommodates the students of the University of Ez-Zitouna.

References 

Habibia Al Sughra
Educational institutions established in 1927
1927 establishments in Africa
1927 establishments in the French colonial empire